Roxbury is an unincorporated community in Lee County, Illinois, United States.

References

Unincorporated communities in Lee County, Illinois
Unincorporated communities in Illinois